The 202nd Pennsylvania House of Representatives District is located in Philadelphia County and includes the following areas:

 Ward 35 [PART, Divisions 01, 02, 03, 04, 05, 06, 07, 08, 12 and 32]
 Ward 53 [PART, Divisions 02, 03, 04, 05, 06, 07, 08, 09, 10, 11, 12, 13, 14, 15, 16, 17, 18, 19, 20, 21, 22 and 23]
 Ward 54 [PART, Divisions 02, 03, 04, 05, 06, 07, 08, 09, 11, 12, 13, 16, 17 and 18]
 Ward 56 [PART, Division 07]
 Ward 62 [PART, Divisions 13, 15, 16, 17, 18, 20, 21, 22, 23, 24, 25 and 26]

Representatives

References

Government of Philadelphia
202